Loughborough MCC University, formerly Loughborough University Centre of Cricketing Excellence, was formed in 2003, and has appeared in first-class cricket since its formation. The players in this list have all played at least one first-class match for Loughborough MCCU.

Players are listed in order of appearance, where players made their debut in the same match, they are ordered by batting order.

Key

List of players

References

Loughborough MCCU
Student cricket in the United Kingdom
Cricket at Loughborough University